Antonio Recamier (born 3 February 1930) is a Mexican sailor. He competed in the 5.5 Metre event at the 1968 Summer Olympics.

References

External links
 

1930 births
Living people
Mexican male sailors (sport)
Olympic sailors of Mexico
Sailors at the 1968 Summer Olympics – 5.5 Metre
Sportspeople from Mexico City